Júlia Bendeová (born 17 February 1940) is a Slovak volleyball player. She competed in the women's tournament at the 1968 Summer Olympics.

References

1940 births
Living people
Slovak women's volleyball players
Olympic volleyball players of Czechoslovakia
Volleyball players at the 1968 Summer Olympics
Sportspeople from Komárno